Manlius may refer to:

Places in the United States
Manlius, Illinois
Manlius (town), New York
Manlius (village), New York
Manlius Township (disambiguation)
Manlius Township, Bureau County, Illinois
Manlius Township, LaSalle County, Illinois
Manlius Township, Michigan

Other uses
Manlius (1826 ship)
Manlius Pebble Hill, a school in DeWitt, New York
any of various Romans belonging to the gens Manlia